Ivan Arteyev (born 24 March 1977) is a Russian cross-country skier. He competed in the men's 15 kilometre classical event at the 2006 Winter Olympics.

References

1977 births
Living people
Russian male cross-country skiers
Olympic cross-country skiers of Russia
Cross-country skiers at the 2006 Winter Olympics